David M. Gilbert is an American molecular biologist, known for work in DNA replication. He is currently an investigator at the San Diego Biomedical Research Institute. Gilbert was formerly a Professor of Molecular Biology in the Department of Biological Science and Co-founder and Former Director of the Center for Genomics and Personalized Medicine at Florida State University. 

Gilbert’s work focuses on the mechanisms regulating DNA replication during the cell cycle and the relationship between DNA replication and structural and functional organization of chromosomes, most recently during differentiation in human and mouse embryonic stem cells and in pediatric leukemia.

Gilbert received his BA degrees in Biochemistry/Cell Biology and Philosophy from the University of California, San Diego and his PhD in Genetics from Stanford University. He did two post-doctoral training periods, first as an EMBO fellow with Pierre Chambon in Strasbourg, France, studying transcriptional control, and second as a Roche fellow with Melvin DePamphilis studying replication origin recognition.

He joined the faculty at State University of New York (SUNY) Upstate Medical University in 1994 and was appointed full professor in 2003. In 2006, he moved to Florida State University. He was elected as a fellow of the American Association for the Advancement of Science (AAAS) in 2008, as well as becoming a member of the American Society of Hematology in 2013 and the International Society for Stem Cell Research in 2014. Gilbert's other awards include being named Florida State University Distinguished Research Professor (2015), the Pfeiffer Endowed Professorship for Cancer Research (2015), and the Florida State University Graduate Mentorship award (2016).

He is a former principal investigator in the NIH Encyclopedia of DNA Elements (ENCODE) Consortium (2011–2017), and is a member of the NIH 4D Nucleome consortium and the Southeast Stem Cell Consortium (SESCC). He has served on American Cancer Society (1996–2004) and NIH study sections (1997–present), is an editorial member of the Epigenetics Society and is on the editorial board of the Journal of Cell Biology (2008–2021). He also maintains ReplicationDomain, a free online database resource for storing, sharing and visualizing large-scale chromosome mapping data.

References

External links
 Gilbert lab website
 ReplicationDomain data base
 

Florida State University faculty
Living people
Year of birth missing (living people)
State University of New York Upstate Medical University faculty
Fellows of the American Association for the Advancement of Science